Nivio Ziviani, a Brazilian researcher born in the city of Belo Horizonte on August 27, 1946, holds a bachelor's degree in mechanical engineering from the Federal University of Minas Gerais, 1971, a master's degree in informatics from the Pontifical Catholic University of Rio de Janeiro, 1976, and a Ph.D. degree in computer science from the University of Waterloo, 1982. As a researcher, he is known for his projects in information retrieval and recommendation systems. In 2011, he received the Scientific Merit Award from the Brazilian Computer Society. Ziviani has Erdös number 2. Currently, he is an emeritus professor in the Computer Science department of the Federal University of Minas Gerais, is a member of the Brazilian Academy of Sciences, he is part of the National Order of Scientific Merit in the Commendator class, and coordinates the Laboratory for Treating Information (LATIN).

Known books 

Among his contributions, he produced three books:

 Projeto de Algoritmos Com implementações em Pascal e em C (Cengage Learning, Third Edition, 2010) (in Portuguese).
 Diseño de Algoritmos com implementaciones en Pascal y C(Thomson Learning, 2007) (in Spanish, translated from the Portuguese version).
 Projeto de Algoritmos Com implementações em Java e C++ (Thomson Learning, Second Edition, 2007) (in Portuguese).

Business 
He created one of the first search engines for the web and fomented the development of companies through his scientific production with respect to Recommendation Systems. He was co-founder of the Miner Technology Group in 1998, which was acquired by Grupo Folha de S.Paulo / UOL in 1999, and Akwan Information Technologies in 2000, bought by Google in 2005. With Akwan, Google started its R & D Center in Latin America located in Belo Horizonte, Brazil. Among his most recent activities, he was co-founder of a start-up called Kunumi, co-founder of the Information Retrieval Research Group at the Federal University of Minas Gerais, General Co-chair of the 28th ACM SIGIR Conference on Research and Development in Information Retrieval, co-founder and member of the Steering Committee of the International Conference on String Processing and Information Retrieval.

References

External links

1946 births
Living people
Academic staff of the Federal University of Minas Gerais
University of Waterloo alumni